The 2018 Denmark Open (officially known as the Danisa Denmark Open presented by Victor 2018 for sponsorship reasons) was a badminton tournament which took place at Odense Sports Park in Odense, Denmark, from 16 to 21 October 2018 and had a total prize of $775,000.

Tournament
The 2018 Denmark Open was the twentieth tournament of the 2018 BWF World Tour and also part of the Denmark Open championships, which had been held since 1935. This tournament was organized by Badminton Denmark and sanctioned by the BWF.

Venue
This international tournament was held at Odense Sports Park in Odense, Denmark.

Point distribution
Below is the point distribution table for each phase of the tournament based on the BWF points system for the BWF World Tour Super 750 event.

Prize money
The total prize money for the tournament was US$775,000. Distribution of prize money was in accordance with BWF regulations.

Men's singles

Seeds

 Viktor Axelsen (second round)
 Kento Momota (champion)
 Shi Yuqi (first round)
 Chou Tien-chen (final)
 Chen Long (first round)
 Son Wan-ho (quarter-finals)
 Srikanth Kidambi (semi-finals)
 Kenta Nishimoto (second round)

Finals

Top half

Section 1

Section 2

Bottom half

Section 3

Section 4

Women's singles

Seeds

 Tai Tzu-ying (champion)
 Akane Yamaguchi (second round) 
 P. V. Sindhu (first round) 
 Ratchanok Intanon (second round)
 Carolina Marín (first round)
 Chen Yufei (quarter-finals)
 He Bingjiao (semi-finals)
 Nozomi Okuhara (quarter-finals)

Finals

Top half

Section 1

Section 2

Bottom half

Section 3

Section 4

Men's doubles

Seeds

 Marcus Fernaldi Gideon / Kevin Sanjaya Sukamuljo (champions)
 Li Junhui / Liu Yuchen (second round)
 Liu Cheng / Zhang Nan (second round)
 Takeshi Kamura / Keigo Sonoda (final)
 Mathias Boe / Carsten Mogensen (second round)
 Mads Conrad-Petersen / Mads Pieler Kolding (first round)
 Fajar Alfian / Muhammad Rian Ardianto (withdrew)
 Takuto Inoue / Yuki Kaneko (quarter-finals)

Finals

Top half

Section 1

Section 2

Bottom half

Section 3

Section 4

Women's doubles

Seeds

 Yuki Fukushima / Sayaka Hirota (champions)
 Chen Qingchen / Jia Yifan  (second round)
 Greysia Polii / Apriyani Rahayu (semi-finals)
 Misaki Matsutomo / Ayaka Takahashi (second round)
 Shiho Tanaka / Koharu Yonemoto (final)
 Mayu Matsumoto / Wakana Nagahara (first round)
 Lee So-hee / Shin Seung-chan (second round)
 Jongkolphan Kititharakul / Rawinda Prajongjai (quarter-finals)

Finals

Top half

Section 1

Section 2

Bottom half

Section 3

Section 4

Mixed doubles

Seeds

 Zheng Siwei / Huang Yaqiong (champions)
 Wang Yilü / Huang Dongping (second round) 
 Tontowi Ahmad / Liliyana Natsir (semi-finals)
 Tang Chun Man / Tse Ying Suet (second round) 
 Mathias Christiansen / Christinna Pedersen (quarter-finals)
 Chan Peng Soon / Goh Liu Ying (quarter-finals)
 Goh Soon Huat / Shevon Jemie Lai (quarter-finals)
 Chris Adcock / Gabrielle Adcock (quarter-finals)

Finals

Top half

Section 1

Section 2

Bottom half

Section 3

Section 4

References

External links
 Tournament Link

Denmark Open
Denmark Open (badminton)
Denmark Open (badminton)
Denmark Open (badminton)